Endura Racing was a British UCI Continental cycling team.

History

Endura Racing were a UCI Continental licensed professional road racing team owned by Endura, a Scottish cycling clothing company owned by the Pentland Group.

The team rode senior professional events in the UCI Europe Tour and British domestic competitions. The team's UCI Continental status did not allow it to ride in the Grand Tours or UCI World Tour races.

In 2013 the team merged with the German-based Pro Continental team, Team NetApp - becoming Team NetApp-Endura.

Major wins

2011
 Overall Tour de Normandie, Alexandre Blain
Stage 7, Alexandre Blain
Overall Cinturón a Mallorca, Iker Camano
Stage 2, Iker Camano
Stage 2 Tour de Bretagne, René Mandri
Stage 4 Tour of Norway, Iker Camano
Stage 1 Czech Cycling Tour, Team Time Trial
Preston Grand Prix, Ian Wilkinson
Stage 2 Tour of Utah, Jack Bauer
Overall Cinturó de l'Empordà, Paul Voss
Stage 1, Paul Voss
2012
 Overall Tour Méditerranéen, Jonathan Tiernan-Locke
Stages 1 & 4, Jonathan Tiernan-Locke
 Overall Tour du Haut Var, Jonathan Tiernan-Locke
Stage 2, Jonathan Tiernan-Locke
Eddie Soens Memorial Road Race, Russell Downing
Grand Prix de la Ville de Lillers, Russell Downing
Stage 3 Tour de Normandie, Ian Wilkinson
Stage 5 Tour de Normandie, Erick Rowsell
Maldon Dengie Tour, Alexandre Blain
Stage 1 Circuit des Ardennes, Russell Downing
Overall Tour Doon Hame, Jonathan McEvoy
Stage 1, Erick Rowsell
Stage 2, Scott Thwaites
Stage 3, Jonathan McEvoy
Rutland-Melton International CiCLE Classic, Alexandre Blain
Tour of the Reservoir, Scott Thwaites
Lincoln Grand Prix, Russell Downing
Stage 5 Glava Tour of Norway, Russell Downing
Tartu GP, Rene Mandri
 British National Circuit Race Championships, Scott Thwaites
Stage 2 Czech Cycling Tour, Zak Dempster
Beaumont Trophy, Russell Downing
Prologue Troféu Joaquim Agostinho, Iker Camaño 
Overall Halfords Tour Series:
Tour Series Kirkcaldy
Individual, Scott Thwaites
Tour Series Durham
Tour Series Oxford
Individual, Scott Thwaites
Tour Series Redditch
Tour Series Canary Wharf
Individual, Zak Dempster
Tour Series Colchester
Tour Series Woking
Individual, Zak Dempster
Premier Calendar Road Race Series, Scott Thwaites
  Overall Tour Alsace, Jonathan Tiernan-Locke
Stages 2 & 4, Jonathan Tiernan-Locke
Stage 3 Vuelta Ciclista a León, Rene Mandri
Stage 2 Mi-Août Bretonne, Ian Bibby
 Overall Tour of Britain, Jonathan Tiernan-Locke

Notes

2012 team
As of 31 December 2012.

References

External links
Official website

Cycling teams based in the United Kingdom
UCI Continental Teams (Europe)
Cycling teams established in 2008
Defunct cycling teams based in the United Kingdom